Federation of Film Societies of Bangladesh (FFSB) is the umbrella organization of film societies in Bangladesh. FFSB commenced its journey on October 24 in 1973 as a federation for all film societies functioning in Bangladesh. FFSB regularly arranges film screenings, film festivals, film appreciation courses and other film making related courses in different cities of Bangladesh. At the end of year 2018, FFSB had 40 regular film societies on its membership rolls all over Bangladesh.

FFSB has focused its activities on the promotion of good cinema, worked to acquire feature and short films to feed its member organizations for screenings, and associate itself with both national and international organizations undertaking similar work.

References 

Cultural organisations based in Bangladesh
1973 establishments in Bangladesh
Trade associations based in Bangladesh